JIPA may refer to:

 Japan Intellectual Property Association
 Journal of the International Phonetic Association